FK Podrinje Janja (Serbian Cyrillic: ФК Пoдpињe Jaњa) is a football club from the town of Janja, Bosnia and Herzegovina. It is one of the oldest clubs in the country.

Players
Many players begin their career in the club, but perhaps the most famous of all is Savo Milošević that after playing in Podrinje signed with Belgrade´s FK Partizan. Afterwards having a worldwide famous career and being Serbian international footballer.

Current squad

Historical list of managers
 Senad Hadžić (February 1, 2014 – February 20, 2015)
 Miroslav Milanović (February 27, 2015 – July 31, 2016)
 Senad Hadžić (August 1, 2016 – September 24, 2018)
 Muhamed Jusufović (March 1, 2019 – June 30, 2019)
 Zumbul Mahalbašić (July 7, 2019 – October 2, 2019)
 Muhamed Jusufović (October 4, 2019 – present)

References

External links
FK Podrinje Janja at FSRS

Football clubs in Republika Srpska
Football clubs in Bosnia and Herzegovina
Association football clubs established in 1927
1927 establishments in Bosnia and Herzegovina